Sulisław may refer to:
Sulisław, Greater Poland Voivodeship (west-central Poland)
Sulisław, Opole Voivodeship (south-west Poland)
Sulisław, West Pomeranian Voivodeship (north-west Poland)
Sulisław of Cracow (died 1241), Polish nobleman